Guilherme Magro Pires Ramos (born 11 August 1997) is a Portuguese professional footballer who plays as a centre back for 2. Bundesliga club Arminia Bielefeld.

Career
On 6 August 2016, Ramos made his professional debut with Sporting B in a 2016–17 LigaPro match against Portimonense.

References

External links

Stats and profile at LPFP 

1997 births
Footballers from Lisbon
Living people
Portuguese footballers
Association football defenders
Liga Portugal 2 players
Sporting CP B players
Bundesliga players
C.D. Mafra players
C.D. Feirense players
Arminia Bielefeld players
Portuguese expatriate footballers
Portuguese expatriate sportspeople in Germany
Expatriate footballers in Germany